James Joseph Duckworth (1908-1967) was an Australian rugby league footballer, a premiership winning coach and administrator.

Playing career
Duckworth was born in 1908 at Balmain, New South Wales who came through the junior ranks to play first grade for the Balmain club. He played nine seasons with Balmain between 1928-1933 and between 1936-1938, although he spent two years at Cessnock and Port Macquarie during 1934-35.

Coaching and administrative career
He returned to coach Port Macquarie and Kempsey teams in the war years before coming to St. George as first grade coach in 1948. Duckworth coached the Saints between 1948-1950, and won the 1949 Grand Final with them. He fell out with the club at the end of 1950 and returned to his old club, Balmain to coach them for the 1951 season without success.

Duckworth later moved into rugby league administration, firstly as a state and then as an Australian selector. He went on to become a Director and Vice-President of the NSWRFL, under Bill Buckley until he died suddenly in 1967.

Death
He died suddenly on 2 July 1967, at his Rozelle, New South Wales home.

References

1908 births
1967 deaths
Australian rugby league administrators
Australian rugby league players
Balmain Tigers coaches
Balmain Tigers players
Date of birth missing
Rugby league centres
Rugby league five-eighths
Rugby league players from Sydney
St. George Dragons coaches